Kingslake is a surname. Notable people with the surname include: 

Hilda Conrady Kingslake (1902–2003), English-American researcher in the field of optics
Rudolf Kingslake (1903–2003), English academic, lens designer, and engineer